The following television stations operate on virtual channel 42 in the United States:

 K07IT-D in West Glacier, etc., Montana
 K14HT-D in Walla Walla, etc., Washington
 K14NI-D in Ferndale, Montana
 K17FE-D in Wadena, Minnesota
 K28DD-D in Bemidji, Minnesota
 K29LS-D in Calexico, California
 K30FZ-D in Willmar, Minnesota
 K32FY-D in Park Rapids, Minnesota
 K32IJ-D in Cortez, Colorado
 K42FE-D in Shreveport, Louisiana
 K42IM-D in Minot, North Dakota
 K42IQ-D in Flagstaff, Arizona
 K42JQ-D in Redding, California
 KABI-LD in Snyder, Texas
 KARZ-TV in Little Rock, Arkansas
 KAXX-LD in San Antonio, Texas
 KBZC-LD in Oklahoma City, Oklahoma
 KCDL-LD in Boise, Idaho
 KCMN-LD in Kansas City, Missouri
 KESQ-TV in Palm Springs, California
 KEYE-TV in Austin, Texas
 KGLA-DT in Hammond, Louisiana
 KLNM-LD in Lufkin, Texas
 KMLM-DT in Odessa, Texas
 KPTM in Omaha, Nebraska
 KPXG-LD in Portland, Oregon
 KSAX in Alexandria, Minnesota
 KSBO-CD in San Luis Obispo, California
 KTMF-LD in Kalispell, Montana
 KTNC-TV in Concord, California
 KUVE-CD in Tucson, Arizona
 KVBI-CD in Clarkston, Washington
 KVEW in Kennewick, Washington
 KVPA-LD in Phoenix, Arizona
 W09DL-D in Mount Vernon, Illinois
 W15EA-D in Memphis, Tennessee
 W24DL-D in Saginaw, Michigan
 W27EH-D in Hattiesburg, Mississippi
 W28EU-D in Macon, Georgia
 WBOC-LD in Cambridge, Maryland
 WCLJ-TV in Bloomington, Indiana
 WEIQ in Mobile, Alabama
 WIAT in Birmingham, Alabama
 WIRS in Yauco, Puerto Rico
 WKOB-LD in New York, New York
 WKWT-LD in Key West, Florida
 WLLC-LD in Nashville, Tennessee
 WNGX-LD in Schenectady, New York
 WNIB-LD in Rochester, New York
 WSJU-LD in Ceiba, Puerto Rico
 WSJZ-LD in Salisbury, Maryland
 WTHC-LD in Atlanta, Georgia
 WTVI in Charlotte, North Carolina
 WVPY in Front Royal, Virginia
 WXEL-TV in West Palm Beach, Florida

The following stations, which are no longer licensed, formerly operated on virtual channel 42:
 K15MA-D in Cottonwood, etc., Idaho
 K19MB-D in Mountain Home, Idaho
 K22DO-D in Granite Falls, Minnesota
 K24NN-D in Twin Falls, Idaho
 K33PW-D in Moses Lake, Washington
 K42JB-D in Wyola, Montana
 KIDZ-LD in Abilene, Texas
 WPBO in Portsmouth, Ohio

References

42 virtual